Eugenio Retes Bisetti (1895-1987) was an actor and writer of Peruvian-Chilean origin who achieved popularity in Chilean comedy plays in the 1930s and in the 1940s and 1950s in musical comedy films directed by Eugenio de Liguoro and José Bohr.

Filmography

Films as writer and actor
 Verdejo gasta un millón (1941)
 Verdejo gobierna en Villaflor (1942)
 Dos caídos de la luna (1945)
 Uno que ha sido marino (1951)
 El gran circo Chamorro (1955)
 Sonrisas de Chile (1969)

Films as actor
 Cabo de Hornos (1956)
 El burócrata González (1964)

References

External links

1895 births
1987 deaths
People from Lima
Naturalized citizens of Chile
Chilean male film actors
20th-century Chilean male actors
Peruvian emigrants to Chile